Addold Mossin (born 12 December 1919) is an Estonian neopaganist and political activist. He is one of the founders of Maavalla Koda.

In 2003, he was awarded with Order of the White Star, V class. He turned 100 in December 2019.

References

1919 births
Living people
Estonian centenarians
Estonian clergy
Men centenarians
Estonian modern pagans
Recipients of the Order of the White Star, 5th Class